"If Tomorrow Never Comes" is a song by American country music artist Garth Brooks. Written by Brooks and Kent Blazy, it was released in August 1989 as the second single from his album Garth Brooks and also appears on The Hits, The Limited Series and Double Live.  This was his first number-one single on the US Billboard Hot Country Singles chart. It is also sometimes referred to as his signature song. "If Tomorrow Never Comes" was named Favorite Country Single in the American Music Awards of 1991.

The song subsequently became one of Brooks' most popular songs for other artists to perform. In 2002, Irish singer Ronan Keating released a version that reached number one in the United Kingdom and three other countries, and it became a top-five hit in several additional territories.

Content

This is the first country love song released by Brooks. A man lies awake at night, thinking what would happen in his love's mind if he were to die the next day. The first line in the chorus reads: "If tomorrow never comes, will she know how much I love her?" He goes on to compare this situation with his own lost loved ones, and how he made a promise to say each day how much she means to him. The song begins with a soft guitar solo and gradually builds up to a more orchestrated accompaniment. Brooks has written many love songs since. This song is about the love of a father to his daughter, not to his lover. Garth said that on stage at Belmont University to Britt Todd and in his music video he has his daughter playing next to him while he sings.

Background and production
Garth provided the following background information on the song in the CD booklet liner notes from The Hits:

"If Tomorrow Never Comes" will probably always be my signature song. I ran the idea for this song by what seemed like a thousand writers and no one really seemed to understand what I was looking for. On the day that Bob Doyle, my co-manager, introduced me to Kent Blazy, I passed this idea by Kent and he had the first verse down within fifteen seconds. I could tell he just felt it. Kent Blazy is a wonderful man, full of love and energy, and if we never write again, I hope that we are always friends first. Thank you Ireland for this moment."

Music video
The music video for the song was directed by John Lloyd Miller, and features Brooks singing and playing guitar in a dim room. Next to him is a table with an oil lamp. The video shows a small child, played by the daughter of Steve Gatlin, brother of Larry Gatlin. The use of an antique screen is present through much of the video, which also features Brooks' then-wife, Sandy.

Chart performance
"If Tomorrow Never Comes" entered the U.S. Billboard Hot Country Singles chart on September 9, 1989, and peaked at number one on December 9.

Weekly charts

Year-end charts

Ronan Keating version

"If Tomorrow Never Comes" served as the first single from Irish singer Ronan Keating's second studio album, Destination. Produced by Steve Mac, the song was released in Australia on April 29, 2002, and in the United Kingdom on May 6, 2002. It peaked at number one in the United Kingdom, Austria, the Czech Republic, Denmark, and Norway and reached the top 10 in 11 other countries, including Australia, Ireland, New Zealand, and Sweden.

Music video
The video starts with Keating sitting on a bed and staring at the woman sleeping in it. He leaves his house and, having fallen onto a road in the path of a moving car, he is run over by it. He goes through the same scene multiple times, apparently stuck in a time loop, unrealistically singing throughout. At the end, he stops the loop by avoiding crossing the road and, instead, walking along the same sidewalk where his front door is.

Track listings
UK CD1
 "If Tomorrow Never Comes" – 3:35
 "If Tomorrow Never Comes" (Groove Brothers mix) – 6:08
 "Interview with Westlife: Ronan Reveals His Secrets to Brian & Nicky" (CD-ROM video)

UK CD2
 "If Tomorrow Never Comes"
 "Ronan Hits Megamix by DMC"
 "Sea of Love"
 "If Tomorrow Never Comes" (video)

UK cassette single
A1. "If Tomorrow Never Comes"
A2. "If Tomorrow Never Comes" (Groove Brothers mix)
B1. "Ronan Hits Megamix by DMC"

Credits and personnel
Credits are lifted from the Destination album booklet.

Studios
 Recorded at various studios in Los Angeles, London, and Dublin
 Mixed at Rokstone Studios (London, England)
 Engineered at Rokstone Studios and Olympic Studios (London, England)
 Master engineered at Metropolis (London, England)
 Mastered at Gateway Mastering (Portland, Maine, US)

Personnel

 Garth Brooks – writing
 Kent Blazy – writing
 The Tuff Session Singers – background vocals
 Friðrik "Frizzy" Karlsson – guitar
 Steve Pearce – bass
 Dave Arch – piano, string arrangement
 Eddie Hession – accordion
 Steve Mac – keyboards, production, mixing, arrangement
 Chris Laws – drums, engineering
 Daniel Pursey – assistant engineering
 Phil Rose – assistant engineering
 Bob Ludwig – mastering
 Tim Young – master engineerering

Charts

Weekly charts

Year-end charts

Decade-end charts

Certifications

Release history

Other versions
Legião Urbana's front man Renato Russo recorded a cover for his debut solo album, The Stonewall Celebration Concert in 1994. Joose had a number one hit in New Zealand with "If Tomorrow Never Comes" in 1997. Puerto Rican salsa singer Ismael Miranda recorded the Spanish version on his 1997 album Con Buena Nota. In 1999, Westlife made an a cappela version live. Engelbert Humperdinck included the song on his 2003 album Definition of Love. It also became part of Barry Manilow's concert repertoire, and is featured on his 2004 live album 2 Nights Live!. Manilow had previously released a studio version of the song on his 1992 CD box set The Complete Collection and then some..... Claudia Jung made a German cover titled "Wenn es morgen nicht mehr gibt"..

In the 2000s, the song has gained added visibility with performances on reality television competition shows, with third-place finisher Elliott Yamin singing it on the fifth season of American Idol. Second season The X Factor winner Shayne Ward performing it in that series' penultimate round, and Australian Idol 2006 winner Damien Leith singing it on Top 10: Number One's Night. Foster & Allen recorded a version which they released on their 2005 album, Foster & Allen – Sing The Number 1's On June 30, 2009, Kevin Skinner sang this song during the auditions on the NBC series America's Got Talent.

References

External links
"If Tomorrow Never Comes" Lyrics 
CMT's The Greatest: 20 Greatest First Videos

1989 singles
1989 songs
2002 singles
Capitol Records Nashville singles
Country ballads
Garth Brooks songs
Music videos directed by John Lloyd Miller
Number-one singles in Austria
Number-one singles in the Czech Republic
Number-one singles in Denmark
Number-one singles in Norway
Number-one singles in Scotland
Pop ballads
Ronan Keating songs
Song recordings produced by Allen Reynolds
Songs written by Garth Brooks
Songs written by Kent Blazy
UK Singles Chart number-one singles
Universal Records singles